Aminabad (also Romanized as Amīnābād) is a village in Piran Rural District, in the Central District of Piranshahr County, West Azerbaijan Province, Iran. At the 2006 census, its population was 165, in 24 families.

References 

Populated places in Piranshahr County